Mikhail Fiksel (born March 21, 1980) is a Russian-American sound designer. He won a Tony Award in the category Best Sound Design of a Play for the play Dana H.

References

External links 

1980 births
Living people
American sound designers
Broadway sound designers
American theatre people
Tony Award winners